is a former Japanese football player. He played for Japan national team.

Club career
Ando was born in Sakado on April 2, 1972. After graduating from Kokushikan University, he joined J1 League club Shimizu S-Pulse in 1995. He became a regular player as right midfielder from 1996. The club won the champions at 1996 J.League Cup. However his opportunity to play decreased behind Daisuke Ichikawa in 1999. In October 1999, he moved to across town to the Shimizu S-Pulse rivals, Júbilo Iwata. At Júbilo Iwata in 1999 season, Júbilo Iwata won the champions beat Shimizu S-Pulse championship playoff. In June 2000, he moved to Yokohama F. Marinos. In 2001, he moved to J2 League club Omiya Ardija and he played as regular player. In 2002, he moved to Gamba Osaka. However he could hardly play in the match. In September 2002, he moved to newly was promoted to J1 League club, Vegalta Sendai and he played many matches as right side back. In 2003, he moved to Omiya Ardija again. Although he played as regular player, he moved to Kyoto Purple Sanga competing for stay J1 in October. However he could hardly play in the match and the club was relegated to J2. In 2004, he returned to Omiya Ardija. He played as regular player and the club was promoted to J1 from 2005. However his opportunity to play decreased in 2005 and retired end of 2005 season.

National team career
In June 1999, Ando was selected for the Japan national team for the 1999 Copa América. At this competition, on July 2, he played against Paraguay.

Club statistics

National team statistics

References

External links
 
 Japan National Football Team Database
 

1972 births
Living people
Kokushikan University alumni
Association football people from Saitama Prefecture
Japanese footballers
Japan international footballers
J1 League players
J2 League players
Shimizu S-Pulse players
Júbilo Iwata players
Yokohama F. Marinos players
Omiya Ardija players
Gamba Osaka players
Vegalta Sendai players
Kyoto Sanga FC players
1999 Copa América players
Association football midfielders